Kim Mu-young (born November 22, 1985) is a South Korean former professional baseball pitcher in Japan's Nippon Professional Baseball. He played for the Fukuoka SoftBank Hawks in 2009 and from 2011 to 2014 and with the Tohoku Rakuten Golden Eagles in 2016.

External links

NPB stats

1985 births
Living people
Criollos de Caguas players
Fukuoka SoftBank Hawks players
Tohoku Rakuten Golden Eagles players
Nippon Professional Baseball pitchers
South Korean expatriate baseball players in Japan
Expatriate baseball players in Puerto Rico